For information on all Iona College sports, see Iona Gaels

The Iona Gaels football program was the intercollegiate American football team for Iona College located in New Rochelle, New York. The team competed in the NCAA Division I Football Championship Subdivision (FCS) and were a FCS Independent school, after formerly competing in the Metro Atlantic Athletic Conference from 1993 to 2007. The school's first football team was fielded in 1965. Iona participated in football from 1965 to 2008, compiling an all-time record of 196–214–7. The Iona football program was discontinued at the conclusion of the 2008 season.

Notable former players
Notable alumni include:
 Tony DeMeo, retired football coach
 Vincent Mazza, star linebacker on 2007 championship team, and former Seton Hall Prep standout. 
 Mike Day and John Kaleh the 2 headed monster better known as Tom Shanks and Leroy Jenkins
 Kyle Flood, former head coach of the Rutgers Scarlet Knights football team and current offensive coordinator for the University of Texas Longhorns football team.
 Joe Pegna, 1998-2002 Captain Center

Championships

Conference championships

References

 
American football teams established in 1965
American football teams disestablished in 2008
1965 establishments in New York (state)
2008 disestablishments in New York (state)